Tomasz Szewczuk (born December 3, 1978 in Lubin) is a Polish footballer.

References
 

1978 births
Living people
Polish footballers
Polish expatriate footballers
Zagłębie Lubin players
FC Rot-Weiß Erfurt players
Odra Wodzisław Śląski players
Śląsk Wrocław players
Korona Kielce players
Miedź Legnica players
Lech Poznań players
Ekstraklasa players
Expatriate footballers in Germany
Association football forwards
People from Lubin
Sportspeople from Lower Silesian Voivodeship